Sudbury/Ramsey Lake Water Aerodrome  is located on Ramsey Lake,  east southeast of  Sudbury, Ontario, Canada. As of the 2013 Water Aerodrome Supplement (WAS) the aerodrome was shown as being closed. However, in 2018 the WAS listed the aerodrome as open with slightly changed coordinates and a new operator.

See also
 Sudbury Airport
 Sudbury/Azilda Water Aerodrome
 Sudbury/Coniston Airport

References

Registered aerodromes in Ontario
Transport in Greater Sudbury
Buildings and structures in Greater Sudbury
Seaplane bases in Ontario